The Bailarge Formation is a geologic formation in Nunavut. It preserves fossils dating back to the Ordovician period.

See also

 List of fossiliferous stratigraphic units in Nunavut

References

 

Ordovician Nunavut
Ordovician northern paleotropical deposits